Three members of the Richardson family were murdered in Medicine Hat, Alberta, Canada in April 2006. The murders were planned and committed by the family's 12-year-old daughter Jasmine Richardson and her 23-year-old boyfriend Jeremy Steinke, now going by the name Jackson May. Richardson and Steinke were each convicted on three counts of first-degree murder. Richardson, who had turned 13 before being convicted, is thought to be the youngest person in Canada ever convicted of multiple first-degree murder counts. Her 10-year sentence was completed on May 6, 2016.

Discovery
At 1:00 p.m. on April 23, 2006, the bodies of husband Marc Richardson, 42, and wife Debra, 48, were found in the basement of their home, and the body of their son Tyler Jacob, 8, was discovered upstairs. Absent from the home at that time was the couple's 12-year-old daughter Jasmine. Both were charged with the three murders. Later, on May 3, 2006, Steinke's friend Kacy Lancaster, 19, was charged with being an accessory, for driving them away in her pickup truck later in the day and for disposing of evidence.

Motive
According to friends of Jasmine, Richardson's parents had grounded her for dating Steinke due to the age disparity. Her friends had also criticized their relationship. Shortly after her arrest, Steinke asked her to marry him, and she agreed. According to friends of Steinke, he told them he was a 300-year-old vampire. He allegedly told his friends that he liked the taste of blood, and wore a small vial of blood around his neck. He also had a user account at the VampireFreaks.com website. The girl had a page at the same site, leading to speculation they met there. However, an acquaintance of Steinke later said the couple actually met at a punk rock show in early 2006. The couple were also found to be communicating at Nexopia, a popular website for young Canadians. Various messages they sent to each other were available to the public, before the accounts were removed by Nexopia staff.

Richardson's user page, under the name "runawaydevil", falsely said she was 15 and ended with the text "Welcome to my tragic end". Just hours prior to committing the murders, Steinke and some friends reportedly watched the 1994 film Natural Born Killers, about a young couple who go on a violent killing spree. Steinke told his friends that he and his girlfriend should go about their plans in a similar manner, but without sparing her little brother. Steinke also said to an undercover officer: 'You ever watch the movie Natural Born Killers?... I think that's the best love story of all time...'.

Legal outcome

Daughter
Under the Youth Criminal Justice Act, Richardson's name could no longer be published in Canada after she became a suspect. Under the same act, twelve is the youngest possible age at which a person can be charged with a crime; convicts who were under fourteen years of age at the time they committed a crime cannot be sentenced as adults, and cannot be given more than a ten-year sentence. On July 9, 2007, Richardson, who had by then turned 13, was found guilty of three counts of first-degree murder in the killings. She is believed to be the youngest person ever convicted of a multiple murder in Canada.

On November 8, 2007, she was sentenced to the maximum allowed under law for someone her age, 10 years imprisonment. Her sentence included credit for eighteen months already spent in custody, to be followed by four years in a psychiatric institution and four-and-a-half years under conditional supervision in the community.

In September 2011, Richardson began attending classes at Mount Royal University in Calgary, Alberta during the final years of her sentence. She was released from a ten-year sentence at a psychiatric hospital in the fall of 2011, and in October 2012 it was reported her rehabilitation was going well, and she expressed remorse for her actions that experts considered genuine.

In May 2016 her sentence was completed, and she was freed of any further court-ordered conditions, restrictions or supervision after a final sentence review on May 6, 2016.

Jeremy Steinke
Steinke admitted to the murder of the parents in conversation with an undercover police officer while in custody. He was tried in November 2008 and found guilty by a jury on three counts of first-degree murder for the killings of the three Richardson victims. On December 15, 2008, Steinke was sentenced to three life sentences, one for each first-degree murder count. The sentences are to be served concurrently, and Steinke will be eligible for parole after serving twenty-five years.

Kacy Lancaster
The accessory to murder charge against the couple's friend, Kacy Lancaster, was dropped, and she pleaded guilty to an obstruction charge in Medicine Hat provincial court. She received one year house arrest as part of the plea bargain, and was ordered to refrain from drugs and alcohol.

In the media
 The Richardson family murders have been featured on the Investigation Discovery show Deadly Women, with Jasmine as the subject and referred to simply as "J.R." due to her age.  It is the first segment of the episode "Forbidden Love."
 The story has been featured on Killer Kids, an American-Canadian documentary show.

See also
 Barbecue murders
 Freeman family murders
 Lin family murders (Australia)
 List of youngest killers

References

Further reading

2006 murders in Canada
2006 in Alberta
April 2006 crimes
Canadian murder victims
Familicides
Murder committed by minors
People murdered in Alberta